was a mid-Edo period Japanese samurai, and the 7th daimyō of Morioka Domain in northern Japan. He was the 33rd hereditary chieftain of the Nanbu clan. His courtesy title was Shuri-no-daifu, (later Daizen-no-daifu) and his Court rank was Junior 4th Rank, Lower Grade.

Toshimi was the posthumous son of Nanbu Nobuoki, the 5th daimyō of Morioka Domain. He was posthumously adopted by his uncle Nanbu Toshimoto on 21 July 1725, becoming the 7th daimyō of Morioka. He was received in formal audience by shōgun Tokugawa Yoshimune on 28 July, and received the formal courtesy title of Shuri-no daifu and Junior 5th court rank, lower grade on 18 December of the same year. On  18 December 1750, he was elevated to Junior 4th court rank. He also received a dispensation on wearing his hair in the standard chonmage style due to his baldness.

Toshimi's  eldest son was demoted to hatamoto status and his three younger sons were allowed to form branches of the Sannohe clan;  he adopted Nanbu Toshikatsu, eldest son of his uncle Toshimoto as his heir before he died in 1752.

References
Papinot, Edmond. (1948). Historical and Geographical Dictionary of Japan. New York: Overbeck Co.

References

External links
 Morioka Domain on "Edo 300 HTML" (3 Nov. 2007)

1708 births
1752 deaths
Tozama daimyo
Nanbu clan
People of Edo-period Japan